The New South Wales Department of Juvenile Justice, known between 1991 and 1993 as the Office of Juvenile Justice, was a State government agency in New South Wales, Australia, that managed juvenile detention centres and other aspects of the youth justice system.

Formation 

Responsibility for children convicted of crimes was removed from the former Child Welfare Department and placed within the Department of Corrective Services in July 1991. Five months later, an independent Office of Juvenile Justice was established.

Locations 
The department operated 34 Juvenile Justice Community Services offices and seven Juvenile Justice Centres, located as follows:

See also

Department of Communities and Justice
Government of New South Wales
List of New South Wales government agencies

References

Juvenile law
Juvenile Justice
1991 establishments in Australia
Government agencies established in 1991
2009 disestablishments in Australia
Government agencies disestablished in 2009